Manuel Barroso (born 9 June 1964) is a Portuguese modern pentathlete. He competed at the 1984, 1988, 1992 and 1996 Summer Olympics.

References

1964 births
Living people
Portuguese male modern pentathletes
Olympic modern pentathletes of Portugal
Modern pentathletes at the 1984 Summer Olympics
Modern pentathletes at the 1988 Summer Olympics
Modern pentathletes at the 1992 Summer Olympics
Modern pentathletes at the 1996 Summer Olympics
Sportspeople from Lisbon